Carleton Goolsby Scott (born October 9, 1988) is an American professional basketball player who currently plays for Pallacanestro Trapani of the Italian League. He played college basketball for University of Notre Dame.

Professional career
Scott went undrafted in the 2011 NBA draft. In August 2011, he signed with Cáceres Ciudad del Baloncesto of Spain for the 2011–12 season. In November 2011, he left Cáceres and signed with UBC Güssing Knights of Austria for the rest of the season.

In July 2012, Scott joined the Brooklyn Nets for the 2012 NBA Summer League. On September 17, 2012, he signed with the Nets. However, he was later waived by the Nets on October 27, 2012. Five days later, he was acquired by the Springfield Armor as an affiliate player.

In July 2013, Scott re-joined the Brooklyn Nets for the 2013 NBA Summer League. On August 31, 2013, he signed with Juvecaserta Basket of the Lega Basket Serie A.

On June 10, 2015, he signed with Antwerp Giants of Belgium.

On June 27, 2016, he signed with Pallacanestro Trapani of Italy in Serie A2.

References

External links
 Belgian League profile
 Notre Dame bio
 Profile at Eurobasket.com

1988 births
Living people
American expatriate basketball people in Austria
American expatriate basketball people in Belgium
American expatriate basketball people in Italy
American expatriate basketball people in Spain
American men's basketball players
Antwerp Giants players
Basketball players from San Antonio
Juvecaserta Basket players
Notre Dame Fighting Irish men's basketball players
Pallacanestro Trapani players
People from Homestead, Florida
Small forwards
Sportspeople from Miami-Dade County, Florida
Springfield Armor players